Television in Serbia was introduced in 1958. It remains the most popular of the media in Serbia—according to 2009 survey, Serbian people watch on average 6 hours of television per day, making it the highest average in Europe.

Free-to-air terrestrial television
Digital television transition has been completed in 2015 with MPEG-4 compression standard and DVB-T2 standard for signal transmission.

National broadcasting
Serbia has a total of 7 national free-to-air channels, which can be viewed throughout the country. These are RTS1, RTS2 and RTS3 from the country’s public network Radio Television of Serbia, as well as private channels Prva, B92, Pink and Happy. These free-to-air channels requires subscription, which is paid via the electricity bill.

Regional and local broadcasting
There are 28 regional and 74 local television channels. Serbia’s northern province, Vojvodina, has a public broadcaster, Radio Television of Vojvodina. It airs 2 channels throughout Vojvodina – RTV1 and RTV2. Via pay tv services those 2 channels can be viewed throughout Serbia, like many regional broadcasters. One of the largest and most watched regional broadcasters is Studio B, which airs across Belgrade's metropolitan area.

Pay television
Some 67% of households are provided with pay television services (i.e. 38.7% cable television, 16.9% IPTV, and 10.4% satellite). There are 90 pay television operators (cable, IPTV, DTH), largest of which are SBB (mainly cable) with 48% market share, Telekom Srbija (mts TV) with 25%, followed by PoštaNet with 5%, and Ikom and Kopernikus with 4% and 3%, respectively.

Cable television
Nearly 39% of households in Serbia have cable television. As a result there are many cable television companies, by far the largest of which is SBB. Cable operators offer not only Serbian channels in their packages but also foreign channels - on average there are 90 channels in basic cable packages.

Internet protocol television
About 17% of households have IPTV.  First IPTV was successfully launched in 2008 by Telekom Srbija and its IPTV service, called mts TV, is today by far the largest IPTV platform in terms of numbers of subscribers. In 2013 SBB has launched an OTT service called D3i.

Satellite television
There are 10.4% of households equipped with satellite dishes. Three dominant DTH services are: SBB platform called Total TV, followed by Polaris (owned by Bulgarian Bulsatcom) and Digi TV (owned by Romanian RCS & RDS).

List of channels

Public channels broadcasting nationally

Private channels broadcasting nationally

Public channels broadcasting regionally

Private channels broadcasting regionally
There are 27 private channels broadcasting with a regional licence. Due to pay television services being widely used across the country, many local and regional channels can be viewed throughout the country.

Domestic pay-tv channels
 Arena Sport 1 (available in HD)
 Arena Sport 2 (available in HD)
 Arena Sport 3 (available in HD)
 Arena Sport 4 (available in HD)
 Arena Sport 5 (available in HD)
 SK HD
 SK 1 (available in HD)
 SK 2 (available in HD)
 SK 3 (available in HD)
 SK 4
 SK 5
 SK 6
 SK Golf (available in HD)
 Lov i ribolov
 SOS Kanal
 N1 (available in HD)
 Prva Plus
 Prva Max
 Prva Kick
 Prva Life
 Prva Files
 Nova.rs (available in HD)
 Cinemania
 Film Klub
 K::CN
 K::CN 2
 K::CN 3
 Naša
 Naša Vremeplov
 Naša Party
 Grand
 Grand 2
 DM SAT
 Melos
 Pink 2
 Pink 3 Info
 Pink Premium
 Pink Movies
 Pink Romance
 Pink Sci-Fi & Fantasy
 Pink Action
 Pink Thriller
 Pink Crime & Mystery
 Pink Classic
 Pink Western
 Pink Horror
 Pink Comedy
 Pink World Cinema
 Pink Film
 Pink Family
 Pink Soap
 Pink Serije
 Pink Koncert
 Pink Hits
 Pink Hits 2
 Pink N Roll
 Pink Music
 Pink Music 2
 Pink Folk
 Pink Folk 2
 Pink Show
 Pink Parada
 Pink Pedia
 Pink Fashion
 Pink Style
 Pink Kuvar
 Pink Super Kids
 Pink Kids
 Pink Zabava
 Pink Plus
 Pink Extra
 Pink World
 Bravo Music
 Pink Reality
 Pink Erotic
 Pink Erotic 2
 Pink Erotic 3
 Pink Erotic 4
 Pink Erotic 5
 Pink Erotic 6
 Pink Erotic 7
 Pink Erotic 8
 Info na dlanu
 Sve na dlanu
 Srpska naučna televizija
 Agro TV
 Ženska TV
 TV Hram

International pay-tv channels
 Al Jazeera Balkans
 FOX (available in HD)
 FOX Crime (available in HD)
 FOX Life (available in HD)
 FOX Movies (available in HD)
 AXN
 AXN Spin
 CBS Drama
 Comedy Central Extra
 Universal
 Sci Fi
 HBO (available in HD)
 HBO 2 (available in HD)
 HBO 3 (available in HD)
 Cinemax (available in HD)
 Cinemax 2 (available in HD)
 CineStar
 CineStar Action
 TV1000
 AMC
 Klasik TV
 Viasat Explorer
 Viasat History
 Viasat Nature
 Viasat Nature/History HD
 National Geographic (available in HD)
 Nat Geo Wild (available in HD)
 Da Vinci Learning
 Discovery
 ID X (available in HD)
 Discovery Science (available in HD)
 Discovery Showcase HD
 Discovery World
 Animal Planet (available in HD)
 Travel Channel (available in HD)
 History (available in HD)
 H2
 CI
 CBS Reality
 Nickelodeon (available in HD)
 Nick Jr.
 Disney Channel
 Disney Junior
 Disney XD
 JimJam
 Minimax
 Cartoon Network
 Boomerang
 Duck TV
 Baby TV
 Eurosport (available in HD)
 Eurosport 2 (available in HD)
 Eurosport News
 Extreme Sports
 Motors TV
 Motorvision
 Fight Channel
 Fight Sports (available in HD)
 Fight Network (available in HD)
 Outdoor (available in HD)
 Trace Sport Stars HD
 Fashion TV (available in HD)
 World Fashion
 FLN
 E!
 TLC
 24kitchen (available in HD)
 Food Network (available in HD)
 Ginx
 MTV
 MTV Live HD
 MTV Dance
 MTV Hits
 MTV Rocks
 VH1
 VH1 Classic
 Trace Urban (available in HD)
 Trace Tropical (available in HD)
 Mezzo
 Mezzo Live HD

Viewership
Following is table of viewership for 7 national free-to-air channels:

See also
 Media of Serbia
 List of Serbian language television channels

References

Further reading

External links
 Republic Broadcasting Agency 
 ANEM - Asocijacija nezavisnih elektronskih medija